"Sexual Guarantee" is a 2000 song by Swedish band Alcazar. It was released as the fourth single from their debut studio album, Casino (2000), and samples Chic's 1979 hit "My Forbidden Lover". The song got many good reviews, but failed to make much of an impact on the charts across Europe. While a favorite of radio stations, it lacked the success of their previous single.

Chart performance
The single was released in Europe, but in different formats and sleeves. For instance England once again made their own sleeves and used their own Alcazar logo. Alcazar's Record Company BMG, in the UK made big effort in promoting Sexual Guarantee. Several promotion posters had been made all across London. And even one of them used the slogan 'Bye Bye Steps, Welcome Alcazar', referring to the sudden disappearance of British pop band Steps.

The first country to release the single was Sweden and Finland and then the rest of Europe followed. Some territories weren't too sure about releasing this track as a single because of the explicit title. Australia for example never did - they released a cover of The Human League's "Don't You Want Me" instead.

Formats and track listings
These are the formats and track listings of promotional single releases of "Sexual Guarantee".

 CD single
"Original Version" - 3:34
"Johan S Vocal Club Mix" - 5:25
"Fu-Tourist Remix" - 5:35
"Johan S Dub Mix" - 7:27

 Cassette single
"Original Version" - 3:34
"Fu-Tourist Remix" - 5:35

Charts

References

External links

Nu-disco songs
Alcazar (band) songs
2000 songs
2001 singles
Songs written by Alexander Bard
Songs written by Anders Hansson (songwriter)